Wanderson de Jesus Martins (born 17 July 1995), commonly known as Caju, is a Brazilian footballer who plays for Aris Limassol as a left-back.

Club career

Santos
Born in Irecê, Bahia, Caju graduated from Santos's youth setup, and was promoted to the first-team in September 2014, profiting from the departure of Emerson Palmieri to Palermo and from Eugenio Mena's injury. He stands as the only player who graduated from Peixe Academy 100% owned by the club since 2010.

On 21 September 2014 Caju made his first-team – and Série A – debut, starting in a 3-1 home win against Figueirense. He overtook Mena and Zé Carlos during the latter stages of the campaign, appearing in 11 matches.

On 10 March 2015, after being linked to Udinese and Barcelona, Caju renewed with Peixe, signing until 2019. He spent the campaign as a backup to Zeca. In 2016, as the latter was representing the Brazil under-23s in the Summer Olympics, Caju was made a starter by manager Dorival Júnior, earning plaudits for his performances.

On 15 July 2017, Caju was loaned to French Ligue 1 side Lille for a fee of €500,000, with an obligatory 4 million buyout clause after 15 matches. In September, however, after failing his medical, he returned to his parent club.

APOEL (loan)
On 22 May 2018, Cypriot side APOEL announced an agreement in principle for the signing of Caju, signing a one-year loan deal with a buyout clause.

Braga
On 23 July 2019, Caju signed a four-year contract with Primeira Liga side Braga.

International career
On 27 November 2014 Caju was called up to the Brazil under-20's, alongside Santos teammates Gabriel and Thiago Maia, for the 2015 South American Youth Football Championship. He made his debut for the side on 15 January 2015, starting in a 2–1 win against Chile.

Career statistics

Honours
Santos
Campeonato Paulista: 2015, 2016
Copa São Paulo de Futebol Júnior: 2014
Copa do Brasil Sub-20: 2013

References

External links
Santos FC profile 

1995 births
Living people
Sportspeople from Bahia
Brazilian footballers
Association football defenders
Campeonato Brasileiro Série A players
Santos FC players
Goiás Esporte Clube players
Cypriot First Division players
APOEL FC players
Primeira Liga players
S.C. Braga players
Aris Limassol FC players
2015 South American Youth Football Championship players
Brazil under-20 international footballers
Brazilian expatriate footballers
Brazilian expatriate sportspeople in Cyprus
Brazilian expatriate sportspeople in Portugal
Expatriate footballers in Cyprus
Expatriate footballers in Portugal